Giuseppe Saronni (born 22 September 1957), also known as Beppe Saronni, is an Italian former racing cyclist. He had remarkable success riding in the Giro d'Italia. In 1980 he won 7 stages and finished 7th overall, in 1981 he won 3 stages and finished 3rd overall. In 1979 and 1983 he would win the Giro d'Italia and all total for his career win 24 stages in this race.

Saronni currently works an advisor for UCI WorldTeam .

Career
Born in Novara, Piedmont, Saronni turned professional in 1977. During his career, that lasted until 1989, he won 193 races. In Italy he gave birth to a famous rivalry with Francesco Moser, like those of Alfredo Binda with Learco Guerra, and Fausto Coppi with Gino Bartali. He competed in the team pursuit event at the 1976 Summer Olympics.

In 1982 he won the World Cycling Championship at Goodwood, England, beating American Greg LeMond and Irishman Sean Kelly. His final sprint was so impressive that it gained him the nickname of La fucilata di Goodwood - "the gunshot of Goodwood". The previous year he had won a silver medal, as he had been overcome in the final by Freddy Maertens of Belgium. In 1982 Saronni also won the Giro di Lombardia.

At the beginning of 1983 another a striking attack on the Poggio climb gave him the Milan–San Remo classic, after three consecutive second places in that race. This was Saronni's last great classics victory.

Career achievements

Major results

1977
 1st Giro del Veneto
 1st Tre Valli Varesine
 1st Giro del Friuli
 1st Trofeo Pantalica
 2nd La Flèche Wallonne
 2nd Giro del Piemonte
 2nd Coppa Placci
 2nd Trofeo Laigueglia
 3rd Overall Tirreno–Adriatico
 3rd Overall Giro di Puglia
 3rd Giro del Lazio
 3rd Giro della Provincia di Reggio Calabria
 4th Gran Premio Città di Camaiore
 5th Giro dell'Emilia
 7th Coppa Bernocchi
 8th Overall Grand Prix du Midi Libre
 8th Overall Giro di Sardegna
 8th Trofeo Matteotti
 9th Road race, UCI Road World Championships
 9th Gran Premio Industria e Commercio di Prato
 10th Milano–Torino
1978
 1st  Overall Tirreno–Adriatico
1st Prologue
 1st  Overall Giro di Puglia
1st Stages 1 & 3b (ITT)
 1st  Overall Ruota d'Oro
1st Stage 2 
 1st Coppa Agostoni
 1st Trofeo Pantalica
 1st Giro di Campania
 1st Stage 4 Giro di Sardegna
 2nd Milan–San Remo
 2nd Coppa Sabatini
 2nd Giro del Friuli
 3rd Road race, National Road Championships
 3rd Giro dell'Appennino
 4th Overall Escalada a Montjuïc
1st Stage 1a (ITT)
 4th Road race, UCI Road World Championships
 4th Giro dell'Emilia
 4th Trofeo Laigueglia
 5th Overall Giro d'Italia
1st Stages 2, 7 & 8
 6th Giro di Toscana
 7th Eschborn–Frankfurt
1979
 1st  Overall Giro d'Italia
1st  Points classification
1st Stages 5, 8 (ITT) & 19 (ITT)
 1st  Overall Tour de Romandie
1st Stages 1 & 4 
 1st  Overall Grand Prix du Midi Libre
1st Prologue & Stage 1 
 1st Züri–Metzgete
 1st Grand Prix of Aargau Canton
 1st Tre Valli Varesine
 1st Trofeo Baracchi (with Francesco Moser)
 1st Gran Premio Città di Camaiore
 1st Prologue Volta a Catalunya
 2nd Tirreno–Adriatico
1st Stage 4 
 2nd Overall Ruota d'Oro
1st Stage 1 
 2nd Milan–San Remo
 2nd La Flèche Wallonne
 2nd Paris–Tours
 2nd Giro di Campania
 2nd Trofeo Laigueglia
 4th Coppa Agostoni
 4th Coppa Placci
 5th Vuelta a Andalucía
1st Stage 5 
 5th GP Industria & Artigianato di Larciano
 5th Trofeo Pantalica
 8th Milano–Torino
 8th Road race, UCI Road World Championships
 10th Giro dell'Emilia
1980
 1st  Road race, National Road Championships
 1st  Overall Giro di Puglia
1st Stages 1, 4 & 5 
 1st La Flèche Wallonne
 1st Tre Valli Varesine
 1st Coppa Bernocchi
 1st Trittico Lombardo
 1st Trofeo Pantalica
 1st Giro di Campania
 1st GP Industria & Artigianato di Larciano
 1st Stage 1 Ruota d'Oro
 2nd Milan–San Remo
 2nd Coppa Sabatini
 3rd Overall Tour de Romandie
1st Prologue 
 3rd Giro del Lazio
 4th Züri–Metzgete
 5th Milano–Vignola
 6th Overall Tirreno–Adriatico
1st Stage 3 
 6th Overall Giro di Sardegna
 7th Overall Giro d'Italia
1st  Points classification
1st Stages 1, 2, 3, 13, 17, 19 & 21 (ITT)
 7th Trofeo Matteotti
1981
 1st Giro di Romagna
 1st Trofeo Laigueglia
 1st Coppa Bernocchi
 1st Gran Premio Città di Camaiore
 1st Giro dell'Etna
 1st Stage 1a Escalada a Montjuïc
 1st Stage 3 Deutschland Tour
 1st Stage 2 Ruota d'Oro
 1st Stage 5 La Méditerranéenne
 Tirreno–Adriatico
1st Stages 2 & 3 
 Giro di Puglia
1st Stages 1 & 2 
 2nd Overall Tour de Romandie
1st Stages 2 & 3 
 2nd  Road race, UCI Road World Championships
 2nd Gran Premio Industria e Commercio di Prato
 3rd Overall Giro d'Italia
1st  Points classification
1st Stages 3, 5 & 6
 3rd Giro del Friuli
 9th Gent–Wevelgem
1982
 1st  Road race, UCI Road World Championships
 1st  Overall Tour de Suisse
1st Stage 1 
 1st  Overall Tirreno–Adriatico
1st Stages 1 & 2 
 1st  Overall Giro del Trentino
1st Stage 3 
 1st  Overall Giro di Sardegna
1st Stages 1, 2 & 4
 1st Giro di Lombardia
 1st Milano–Torino
 1st Coppa Agostoni
 1st Coppa Sabatini
 1st Trofeo Pantalica
 1st Stage 1 Deutschland Tour
 1st Stage 1 Ruota d'Oro
 Vuelta a Andalucía
1st Stages 1, 2, 4a & 5
 2nd Giro del Friuli
 6th Overall Giro d'Italia
1st Stages 2, 9 & 21
 6th Paris–Brussels
 7th La Flèche Wallonne
1983
 1st  Overall Giro d'Italia
1st  Points classification
1st Stages 4, 13 (ITT) & 16b
 1st Milan–San Remo
 Vuelta a España
1st Stages 9 & 10 
 2nd Liège–Bastogne–Liège
 5th Trofeo Pantalica
1984
 Tour of Norway
1st Stages 3 & 5
1985
 1st Trofeo Pantalica
 1st Stage 3 Giro di Puglia
 1st Stage 1 Vuelta a Andalucía
 Giro d'Italia
1st Stages 2 (TTT), 3 & 16
 2nd Tre Valli Varesine
 3rd Overall Settimana Internazionale di Coppi e Bartali
1st Stage 3 
1986
 1st  Overall Settimana Internazionale di Coppi e Bartali
1st Stage 3
 1st Trofeo Baracchi (with Lech Piasecki)
 2nd Overall Giro d'Italia
1st Stage 3 (TTT)
 2nd Overall Giro di Puglia
1st Stages 2 & 4 
 3rd  Road race, UCI Road World Championships
 4th Milan–San Remo
1987 
 1st Milano–Vignola
 1st Stage 4 Tirreno–Adriatico
 2nd Trofeo Baracchi
1988
 1st  Overall Giro di Puglia
1st Stage 1
 1st Tre Valli Varesine
 1st Stage 4b (TTT) Giro d'Italia
 2nd Overall Settimana Internazionale di Coppi e Bartali
 2nd Road race, National Road Championships
 2nd Coppa Placci
 10th Overall Vuelta a Andalucía
1st Stage 2
1989 
 1st Prologue Vuelta a Andalucía
 2nd Giro di Romagna
1990 
 1st Giro della Provincia di Reggio Calabria

Grand Tour general classification results timeline

References

External links
 

1957 births
Living people
People from Novara
Italian male cyclists
Giro d'Italia winners
Italian Giro d'Italia stage winners
UCI Road World Champions (elite men)
Tour de Suisse stage winners
Cyclists from Piedmont
Olympic cyclists of Italy
Cyclists at the 1976 Summer Olympics
Sportspeople from the Province of Novara